Nagel-Heyer Records is a German jazz record label based in Hamburg.

Nagel-Heyer was founded in 1992 by Hans and Sabine Nagel-Heyer to issue primarily live recordings of both North American and European jazz performers. By 2004, it had released nearly 200 albums.

History
Sabine Nagel-Heyer managed a twenty-four hour jazz station in Germany. She and her husband, Hans, attended a concert in Bremen, Germany, by a group that included Kenny Davern, Eddie Higgins, George Masso, Danny Moss, and Randy Sandke. The promoter persuaded the couple to sponsor a concert in Hamburg on September 26, 1992, George Gershwin's birthday. The concert was recorded under the title the Wonderful World of George Gershwin, and when it was broadcast on the station, listeners wanted to buy a copy.

The German government warned that the station's dwindling profits could lead to the loss of its license. The format was changed so that jazz aired only once a week, giving Sabine Nagel-Heyer time to concentrate on more live recordings. By 1994, the label released a new live concert every month. Nagel-Heyer concentrates on live recordings of mainstream jazz, sing, and Dixieland. The label's roster includes Harry Allen, Wycliffe Gordon, Byron Stripling, Donald Harrison, Ken Peplowski, and Randy Sandke.

Artists
Howard Alden
Harry Allen
Alan Barnes
Ruby Braff
Bill Charlap
Buck Clayton
Dylan Cramer
Wayne Escoffery
Wycliffe Gordon
Jake Hanna
Donald Harrison
Jeanie Lambe
Johannes Ludwig
Lyambiko
Susanne Menzel
Roy Powell
Marcus Printup
Eric Reed
Claudio Roditi
Randy Sandke
Martin Sasse
Zoot Sims
Terrell Stafford
Robert Stewart
Byron Stripling
Ralph Sutton
Clark Terry
Warren Vaché
Frank Vignola
Sophie Wegener
Bob Wilber

References

German record labels
Record labels established in 1992